Kibungo Municipality was a municipality within the Rwandan Kibungo Province (now part of Eastern Province).

Population: 43,582 (2002 figures); area: 97 square kilometers.

References  
 

Populated places in Rwanda

Districts and municipalities of Kibungo